Puchkov (from пучок meaning bundle, beam) is a Russian masculine surname, its feminine counterpart is Puchkova. Notable people with the surname include:

Aleksandr Puchkov (born 1957), retired male hurdler and Olympic bronze medallist
Aleksei Puchkov (born 1982), Russian professional football player
Dmitry Puchkov (born 1961), English-to-Russian movie and video game translator, script-writer, and author
Ganna Pushkova-Areshka (born 1978), Belarusian sprint canoeist
Nikolai Puchkov (1930–2005), ice hockey player who played in the Soviet Hockey League
Olga Puchkova (born 1987), Russian tennis player and model
Serhiy Puchkov (born 1962), former midfielder, currently head-coach of SC Tavriya Simferopol in the Ukrainian Premier League

Russian-language surnames